Marina Khmelevskaya (born 30 July 1990) is a Uzbekistani long distance runner who specialises in the marathon. She competed in the women's marathon event at the 2016 Summer Olympics.

References

External links
 

1990 births
Living people
Uzbekistani female long-distance runners
Uzbekistani female marathon runners
Athletes (track and field) at the 2016 Summer Olympics
Olympic athletes of Uzbekistan
Athletes (track and field) at the 2014 Asian Games
People from Fergana
Asian Games competitors for Uzbekistan
21st-century Uzbekistani women